RoboCop is a 1994 cyberpunk television series based on the RoboCop franchise. It stars Richard Eden as the title character. Made to appeal primarily to children and young teenagers, it lacks the graphic violence of the original film RoboCop and its sequel RoboCop 2 and is more in line with the tone of RoboCop 3.

The television series ignores the events of the sequels and many character names are changed from the movie series.  The RoboCop character has several non-lethal alternatives to killing criminals, which ensures that certain villains can be recurring. The OCP Chairman and his corporation are treated as simply naïve and ignorant, in contrast to their malicious and immoral behavior from the second film onward.

Background
While RoboCop was initially an American property, Orion Pictures received a $500,000 cash infusion for TV licensing rights by Canada's Skyvision Entertainment. This allowed access to co-production agreements and possible partnerships with other countries. The series was filmed in Toronto and Mississauga, Ontario and originally planned for a January 1994 debut, several months after the unsuccessful release of RoboCop 3. Skyvision was also in negotiation with Peter Weller, the original RoboCop, but this did not come to fruition. 22 episodes were made, but the series was not renewed for a second season. Expense played a significant part in this; according to Skyvision VP Kevin Gillis, episodes would be produced at $1.2 million to $1.5 million each.

The pilot episode runs two hours and was adapted from a discarded RoboCop 2 script, Corporate Wars, by the writers of the original RoboCop, Edward Neumeier and Michael Miner.

Villains on the series include Dr. Cray Z. Mallardo, OCP executive Chip Chayken, William Ray Morgan aka Pudface, Vlad Molotov.

The series gave writers more of an opportunity to develop the central characters and to extend the human interest aspect through the introduction of Gadget, the station mascot and the adopted, insightful daughter of station Sergeant Parks.  Gadget, along with the presence of Jimmy Murphy did much to shift the focus from the adult to the youth target audience. The writers also introduced an element of virtual camaraderie in the character Diana, formerly a secretary to crooked Vice-president Chip Chayken, who is unwillingly turned into the 'mind' of Metronet and OCP's city-running super-computer, NeuroBrain and RoboCop's biggest 'behind-the-scenes' ally in his fight-against-crime.

Many of the characters' names were also altered from their movie counterparts due to rights issues.

Cast

Main
 Richard Eden as Officer Alex James Murphy / RoboCop.  When out on duty, his callsign is "Beta 1".  
 Yvette Nipar as Officer / Detective Lisa Madigan, of the Metro South Police Station. She is based on the character Anne Lewis played by Nancy Allen in the film series.  When out on duty, Madigan's callsign is "Beta 2".  In Midnight Minus One, Madigan mentions 'coming from money' and that 'it doesn't necessarily do anything good for a family' (her movie counterpart, Anne Lewis, mentions having a brother in Pittsburgh, who never bothers to call her).  
 Blu Mankuma as Sergeant Stanley Parks, Watch Commander of the Metro South Police Station, in Old Detroit. He is based on Sgt. Warren Reed played by Robert DoQui in the film series.  
 Andrea Roth as Diana Powers; the clumsy secretary of Chip Chayken at OCP, who used her brain for the NeuroBrain project. RoboCop stopped him and Dr. Cray Mallardo from erasing Diana's personality.  Diana is now nigh-omniscient/omnipresent throughout Delta City and Old Detroit, along with any computer system that is a part of Metronet/NeuroBrain or else has access to or can hack into.  She would often appear as a hologram, sometimes only visible to Robocop.
 David Gardner as OCP Chairman; He cares about Old Detroit and learns a lesson in almost every appearance, bettering his character, but is ignorant of certain things. He is based on The Old Man played by Dan O'Herlihy in the first two films.  
 Sarah Campbell as Gadget, an 8/9-year-old girl, who was adopted by Sgt. Stanley Parks following the events of the Pilot Episode, "The Future of Law Enforcement". Later, in episode 17, "Mothers Day", her birth name is revealed as "Gertrude Modesto", ("Gadget" was just the name assigned to her by Family Services), and that at the age of 3-weeks-old she was given up for adoption by her mother, Sally Modesto, who, as a numbers runner for Russian Mafia Crimeboss, Vlad 'Stitch' Molotov, could not give her daughter the life she wanted to give her. Gadget first became friends with Jimmy Murphy in episode 9, "Provision 22".

Recurring cast
 Ed Sahely as Charlie Lippencott, RoboCop's technician.  
 Dan Duran as Bo Harlan, newscaster.  
 Erica Ehm as Rocky Crenshaw, newscaster.  
 Patrick McKenna as Umberto Ortega, a narcissistic talk show host.  
 Jennifer Griffin as Nancy Murphy, wife/widow of the late Alex Murphy.  
 Peter Costigan as James Daniel 'Jimmy' Murphy, the now-adolescent son of the late Alex Murphy. He first became friends with Gadget in episode 9, "Provision 22".  
 Jordan Hughes as Young Jimmy Murphy.
 Martin Milner as Russell Murphy, father of the late Alex Murphy, and a retired police captain and chess master.  
 Nonnie Griffin as Dorothy Murphy, mother of the late Alex Murphy, and a retired teacher.

Villains
 James Kidnie as William Ray 'Pudface' Morgan; a criminal who blames RoboCop for his disfigurement caused by a toxic accident of Pudface's own making. His character is based on the first Robocop film character Emil Antonowsky, who suffers a similar (but fatal) disfigurement at the end of the film. Repeatedly thwarted by Robocop, and repeatedly requesting him not to punch him in the face when he is. (Requests which are always ignored by Robocop)
 Cliff De Young as Dr. Cray Z. Mallardo; a cyberneticist, and a paranoid, psychopathic prima donna/diva.  In the final episode, Public Enemies, Mallardo's IQ is measured at a 210 IQ, and his psychological evaluation diagnosis identifies him as a paranoid psychopath.  
 John Rubinstein as Chip Chayken, an executive of OCP who co-operated with Mallardo to harvest the brains of homeless people for use in the supercomputer, NeuroBrain.  
 Wayne Robson as 'Shorty', one of 'Pudface' Morgan's two "trigger men".  
 Donald Burda as Leo, one of 'Pudface' Morgan's two "trigger men".  
 Hrant Alianak as Vlad 'Stitch' Molotov, so-called because of the scar on his face which is why he doesn't like to be called "Stitch". He is the head of the Detroit branch of the Russian Mafia.  
 Daniel Kash as Reggie Braga, Brazilian crime boss.
 Barry Flatman as Simon Atwater
 Chris Wiggins as Dr. Roger Yung

Others
 Roddy Piper as Tex Jones, formally "clean-living ... mild-mannered audio-visual research scientist ... with a flair for art" working for Mili-Tech Concepts (part of OCP), before his near-death, disfigurement and addlement at the hands of Simon Atwater.  At the same time of the attempt on his life, Jones had just invented the "Phase-Pulse Image-Projector", allowing for secret messages to be passed for intelligence-gathering.  Jones is also the original creator of "Commander Cash", before Atwater stole the concept (and Jones' other idea, the "Phase-Pulse Image-Projector"), trying to kill Jones in the process.  Appears only in Robocop vs. Commander Cash; for most of the episode, Jones poses as Commander Cash in an attempt to foil Atwater for stealing his creations and using them for his plan to drug/mind-control children, en-masse, teaming-up with RoboCop to stop this. Note that the episode's "subliminal messages" theme mirrors that of the cult-classic sci-fi movie They Live, which starred Roddy Piper.

Episodes

Soundtrack

A soundtrack entitled A Future to This Life: Robocop - The Series Soundtrack was released 24 January 1995, on both CD and cassette by Pyramid Records. Aside from the show's theme writers, Joe Walsh & Lita Ford, it features classic rock songs from groups like The Band, The Flamingos, Iron Butterfly, and KC & the Sunshine Band.

Home media
The first five episodes were released on VHS in 1995. Episodes of the series were also released in a Japanese laserdisc set. They include "First Suspect," "Delta City," and "Absence of Police." In Germany and Italy, "The Future Of Law Enforcement" was released as a stand-alone film on V.H.S. and D.V.D., under the name RoboCop 4: Law & Order.

In 2021, Rallie LLC, an affiliate company of co-production partner Rigel Entertainment, acquired the rights to the show from Robocop IP holder MGM. Coinciding with this sale, Rallie remastered all 21 episodes plus the show's two hour pilot and inked deals with streaming service Tubi, as well as home media company Liberation Hall, to release these remasters on to streaming and DVD & Blu-ray respectively.

Merchandise
An action figure collection for the series was produced by little-known Toy Island, a company that would continue making RoboCop figures in the future. The basic series includes RoboCop, Madigan, Stan Parks, Commander Cash (also released as "Commandant Cash"), and Pudface. It also features the OCP Interceptor, Tactical Field Vehicle, Tactical Field Ambulance, Mobile Armored Detention Vehicle, and Cryochamber playset. In 1995, the Power Glow figure series was released. This includes RoboCop variations with illuminating armor such as a basic RoboCop (blue), Thermo Shield RoboCop (red), and Xicor Shield RoboCop (lime green). Each figure in the collection includes various accessories and several points of articulation.

References

External links

 
 RoboCop Archive - RoboCop

RoboCop television series
1990s American science fiction television series
1994 American television series debuts
1994 American television series endings
1990s Canadian science fiction television series
1994 Canadian television series debuts
1994 Canadian television series endings
CTV Television Network original programming
First-run syndicated television programs in the United States
Television series by MGM Television
Alternative sequel television series
Action figures
English-language television shows
American action television series
Canadian action television series
Live action television shows based on films
Television shows filmed in Toronto
Culture of Mississauga
Television series set in 2005